The Toți is a right tributary of the river Sărata in Romania. It discharges into the Sărata near Nenișori. It flows through the villages Sălciile,  and Jilavele. The Toți flows through the Jilavele reservoir.

References

Rivers of Romania
Rivers of Ialomița County